Girlstuff/Boystuff is an animated series created by Ruth Beni. In Canada, it aired on YTV. In the United States, it aired on Noggin during its nighttime block, The N.

Overview 
The show is about six teenage friends, who talk about the differences between girls and boys, examining topics such as hobbies, food, music and fashion.

Characters 

 Hanna: She is the fashion queen in the group. She's spoiled and absolutely loves shopping. She is bossy in some way and is always trying to change other's fashion statement or style and tries to make it like her own.
 Reanne: She does her bit for the environment and is a free spirit. She loves animals and thinks everyone has a good side. She wants to save the earth by cleaning parks, volunteering in nature groups and gets her friends involved in some way.
 Talia: She is the youngest in the group, but her outfits make her look older. She has a say what you think/nervous demeanour. Her favourite things are filming and photography. She also has her own website.
 Jason: He is Talia's brother and not the only person who would refuse to try at all but in the end he wins. He loves music and is nearly always wearing his headphones and portable CD player. He likes to keep with the flow and the latest cool stuff. He wants to become a DJ.
 Ben: Slightly obnoxious, Ben most likely to have the latest "coolnest" but at the end of the day he's a good boy who cares about his friends. He is probably the second biggest show-off, behind Hanna.
 Simon: He is the smartest of the group and is a computer whiz. He's kind of a nerd but his friends like to think of him as a cool smart guy. He is very cautious.

Cast and crew 
The series was created by Ruth Beni of Animage Films UK. 
Drew Nelson - Jason (voice)
Jonathan Malen - Ben (voice)
Bryn McAuley - Hanna (voice)
Novie Edwards - Reanne (voice)
Jackie Rosenbaum - Talia (voice)
Amos Crawley - Simon (voice)
Steven DeNure - Executive Producer
Neil Court - Executive Producer
Beth Stevenson - Executive Producer
Dan Fill - Producer
Richard Switzer - Producer
Jono Grant - Composer (Season 2)
Seedpod - Theme song performer

Television airing
The show was first premiered on YTV in Canada on 4 November 2002. In the United States, it aired on Noggin's teen block, The N. In Australia, it aired on ABC2's Rollercoaster block.

Media release

The show was only ever released on VHS and DVD in Australia by ABC DVD. The complete series was also released onto YouTube by PorchLight Entertainment's KidMango in the United States.

Episodes

Season 1 

 "Games Peeps Play" / "Tents Situation"
 "Secrets & Lies" / "Face Powder Blues"
 "Tickets, Please" / "Mall's Fair"
 "Birthday Party" / "The Art of You"
 "Flu Manchu" / "Save Me"
 "Lip Gloss Queen" / "Breaking Up is Hard to Do"
 "Skaterchick" / "Blind Date"
 "Party of the Year" / "Babysitting Miss Dot"
 "Truth or Dare" / "Multiplex"
 "The In Crowd" / "Gorilla My Dreams"
 "Good Morning Rover" / "Un-Amusement Park"
 "The Incredible Geeks" / "The Art of the Deal"
 "Citizen Cane" / "Discount Fever"
 "Bad Memories" / "Presently Surprised"
 "Cha-Ching" / "Slam"
 "Cram Session" / "Listen to the Music"
 "The Making of..." / "The Afternoon Snack Club"
 "The Young and the Foolish" / "Cause and Effects"
 "Assess This" / "The Valentine Curse"
 "The Perfect Math" / "Selling Out"
 "Drama Queen" / "Mother's Day"
 "The Lake" / "Klingon Someone Else"
 "The Big Switch" / "Foreign Bodies"
 "Stuff-a-Palooza" / "Video Return"
 "Weekend Rental" / "Last Minute Shopping"
 "Ghoulstuff/Boilstuff"

Season 2 

 "Style 911" / "Eleven Minute Workout"
 "Health Class Horrors" / "Lights, Camera, Ahhhh!"
 "Express Yourself" / "Casting Call"
 "Return to Sneder" / "Medieval Mayhem"
 "Track and Field Fiasco" / "Dot's Dilemma"
 "Lust in Translation" / "Spring Break"
 "Dirty Work" / "Trading Spaces"
 Clique Chic; Future Tense
 If the Shoe Fits; Teacher's Pet
 Bowling for Dollars and Dates; Adventures in Cousin-sitting
 Movin' On; Three Up, Three Down
 Date O Rama; Stuck
 Monsters in Space; Bugged Out

References

External links 
ABC Kids page
Girl stuff/Boy stuff page at ABC
 

2000s British animated television series
2002 British television series debuts
2003 British television series endings
2000s Canadian animated television series
2002 Canadian television series debuts
2003 Canadian television series endings
2002 Chinese television series debuts
2003 Chinese television series endings
British children's animated television shows
Canadian children's animated television series
Chinese children's animated television series
English-language television shows
Australian Broadcasting Corporation original programming
YTV (Canadian TV channel) original programming
Teen animated television series
Television series by DHX Media
Television shows set in Toronto